In business, B Corporation (also B Lab or B Corp) is a private certification of for-profit companies of their "social and environmental performance". It is distinct from the United States legal designation of a benefit corporation. B Corp certification is conferred by B Lab, a global nonprofit organization with offices in the United States, Europe, Canada, Australia and New Zealand, and a partnership in Latin America with Sistema B. To be granted and to maintain certification, companies must receive a minimum score of 80 from an assessment of "social and environmental performance", integrate B Corp commitments to stakeholders into company governing documents, and pay an annual fee based on annual sales. Companies must re-certify every three years to retain B Corporation status.

, there are 5,697 certified B Corporations across 158 industries in 85 countries.

Purpose

B Lab certification is a third-party standard requiring companies to meet social sustainability and environmental performance standards, meet accountability standards, and be transparent to the public according to the score they receive on the assessment. B Lab certification applies to the whole company across all product lines and issue areas.

An issue in deciding to be a certified B Corporation would be the administrative and legal costs a corporation will face in changing their business model in accordance to B Labs regulations.

As a matter of law, in Massachusetts or states that recognize B Corporation certification, it doesn't bring any legal significance to its shareholders, stakeholders or to its employees. However, the certification brings a multitude of branding tools to the corporation.

B Corp certification will bring no legal liabilities to a C Corporation or any for-profit business structures apart from its business model structure which should adhere to the B Labs. To add on, many C corporations usually adapt the B Corporation certificate to gain goodwill.

Advantages
 Similar to other business associations, certified B Corporations and their employees have access to a number of discounts from outside entities and fellow members.
 Academic contributions of loan forgiveness.
A branding tool
No legal liability

Disadvantages
 B Lab certification has no legal status.
In order to obtain and maintain a B Corporation certification, B Lab charges annual administrative and legal fees depending on the revenue generated by the respective companies.

Distinction from benefit corporation

 Benefit corporation is a legal status conferred by state law in the US; B Lab certification is issued by a non-profit organization and has no legislative framework.
 B Lab certification is not needed to obtain benefit corporation status.
 (USA only) Legislation for the passage of benefit corporation legal status has been passed in 35 states, including Delaware, whereas B Lab certification is privately issued by an organization run by people principally from the business community.

Certification process
The company needs to adhere their corporate legal structure to B-Lab regulation in order to qualify for the certification process.

Online assessment
To obtain a B Corporation certification, a company first completes an online assessment. Companies that earn a minimum score of 80 out of 200 points undergo an assessment review process, essentially a conference call verifying the claims made in their assessment. Companies are required to provide supporting documentation before they are certified.

The assessment covers the company’s entire operation and measures the positive impact of the company in areas of governance, workers, community, the environment, as well as the product or service the company provides. Socially and environmentally-focused business model points ultimately are accrued in their relevant impact area (governance, workers, community or environment). Depending on a company's industry, geographic location, and number of employees, the online assessment adjusts the weightings of the question categories to increase its relevancy. For instance, companies with more employees will have a heavier weighting in the workers category, and companies in manufacturing will have a heavier weighting in the environment category.

To maintain credibility, the B Corporation certification standard operates under principles that are independent, comprehensive, comparable, dynamic, and transparent. B Lab has an established standards advisory council that can independently make decisions with or without the support of B Lab.  As of May 2014, 28 of 30 members were listed by their business affiliation. The council recommends improvements to the B Corp assessment on a biennial basis. There is a 30-day public consultation period before releasing a new version of the B Corporation assessment.

Currently the B Corp Impact Assessment is its sixth version which released in January 2019.

Requirements 
Certification also requires companies to integrate their stakeholder commitments into the company governing documents. In the United States, the avenue for corporations making the legal amendment to certify will depend on the state in which they are incorporated. Some states, known as "constituency" states, will allow for this change in the articles of incorporation, but other states, known as "non-constituency states", will not; and many states now have the option of adopting the benefit corporation legal structure, which also meets B Lab's requirements for B Corp certification. Beyond the corporate model, other for-profit business entities make an amendment of the company by-laws or governing documents. These include:
 The establishment of clear wording to "consider stakeholder interests" in company articles of incorporation or company by-laws.
 Define "stakeholders" as their employees, the community, the environment, suppliers, customers, as well as existing shareholders. 
 No prioritization of one stakeholder over another.
 Allowing for the company's values to exist under new management, investors, or ownership.

However, B Lab certification allows the company bylaws to remain secret.

Verification and transparency requirements
On completing the assessment, a company are required to meet certain transparency requirements and background checks to become a certified B Corp. These requirements are: an in-depth review of public record of the companies, employees, products and other relative topics and randomised site visits. Companies are required to re-certify every 3 years.

Notable B Corporations

Allbirds
Ben & Jerry's
Coursera
Danone North America
Ecosia
Ethique
Laureate Education
Meow Wolf
Natura & Co 
Nespresso
Patagonia, Inc.
Rude Records
Saxbys Coffee
Sendle
Seventh Generation Inc.
The Body Shop

Criticism 

B Lab has been criticized for framing accreditation as a substitute for good governance. Many B Corps have run into issues and controversies, leading many to question the worth of corporation. For example, in 2021, BrewDog, a Fully Certified B Corp, was accused by former staff as having a "rotten culture". In 2022, 30 Certified B Corps joined together, with certification watchdog, Fair World Project, to petition against Nespresso’s Certification as a B Corp.

B Corporation has also been criticized for not being the “force for radical change” required to tackle the world’s pressing problems. The fact that B Corp standards are not legally enforceable, and that none of a companies' governing bodies and leadership are liable for damages if a company fails to meet them has also been flagged as a problem.

International adoption
In February 2022, there were over 4,673 certified B Corporations across 155 industries in 78 countries, including Canada (78 companies), Australia, South Africa, and Afghanistan. The most active community outside of the United States is Sistema B.  Since 2012, Sistema B has been the adaptation of the B Corps movement in Latin America, including in Argentina, Brazil, Chile, Uruguay and Colombia.  This non-profit adapts proprietary certifications and evaluation metrics and modifies both to the context of each country. B Lab also assists Sistema B in incorporating a benefit corporation distinction into local legal systems.

See also
 Low-profit limited liability company
 Social purpose corporation
 Sustainable business

References

Further reading

 
 
 
 *

External links 

Benefit Corporation Information Center

 
Social entrepreneurship
Social economy
Product certification
Benefit corporations